Hjularöd Castle is a manor house at Eslöv Municipality in Scania, Sweden.

History
The estate was first mentioned in 1391. The main house  was built in 1894–1897 for chamberlain Hans Gustaf Toll. French medieval castles, the château de Pierrefonds in particular, were inspiration for the manor when architects Isak Gustaf Clason (1856 –1930) and Lars Israel Wahlman (1870–1952) designed it.
The manor has been owned by members of the Bergengren family since 1926 and is not open to the public.
Outside scenes from the 1996 Swedish SVT Christmas Calendar production Mysteriet på Greveholm were filmed in the courtyard of the manor.

See also
List of castles in Sweden

References

External links
Official webpage 

Buildings and structures in Skåne County
Water castles